Lobelanine is a chemical precursor in the biosynthesis of lobeline.

References

Biosynthesis
Piperidine alkaloids